Riswan Lauhin (born 8 August 1998) is an Indonesian professional footballer who plays as an centre-back for Liga 1 club Persebaya Surabaya.

Club career

Persebaya Surabaya
He was signed for Persebaya Surabaya and played in Liga 1 in 2022-2023 season. Lauhin made his league debut on 25 July 2022 in a match against Persikabo 1973 at the Pakansari Stadium, Cibinong.

Career statistics

Club

Notes

References

External links
 Riswan Lauhin at Soccerway
 Riswan Lauhin at Liga Indonesia

1998 births
Living people
People from Ternate
Sportspeople from North Maluku
Indonesian footballers
Persiter Ternate players
Cilegon United players
Persebaya Surabaya players
Liga 1 (Indonesia) players
Association football defenders